Kenan Şimşek (born 1968 in Ordu, Turkey) is a former Turkish Olympian  wrestler competing in the 90 kg division of freestyle. He was a member of the club Ankara Büyükşehir Belediyesi SK.

Born 1968 in Ordu, northern Turkey, Kenan Şimşek began his wrestling career at Samsun in 1984.

Achievements
He was Olympic silver medalist in Freestyle wrestling in 1992. He placed sixth at the 1990 and 1991 World Wrestling Championships.

Şimşek is the holder of three bronze medals won at the European Wrestling Championships in Poznań, Poland (1990), Kaposvar, Hungary (1992) and Istanbul, Turkey (1993).

He captured the gold medal at the 1991 Mediterranean Games held in Athens, Greece.

Oil wrestling
Kenan Şimşek performed also Turkish traditional sport of oil wrestling. He participated at the prestigious Kırkpınar oil wrestling competitions held every year in Edirne.

After three times becoming the third ranked in 1996, 1998 and 2001, he won the "Başpehlivan" (literally: Master wrestler) title at the 642th edition of Kırkpınar in 2003. In 2005, he became again "Başpehlivan" at the 5th Golden Hazelnut Festival held in Çatalpınar, Ordu.

He repeated his "Master wrestler" title gain at the 16th Kumru Düzova Oil Wrestling Competition at his hometown in 2008, which he had won already in 2001.

In 2010, Şimşek took the "Başpehlivan" title of the Hıdırellez Festival held in Sakarlı village of Terme in Samsun.

References

External links
 

1968 births
Sportspeople from Ordu
Living people
Olympic wrestlers of Turkey
Wrestlers at the 1992 Summer Olympics
Turkish male sport wrestlers
Olympic silver medalists for Turkey
Olympic medalists in wrestling
Medalists at the 1992 Summer Olympics
Mediterranean Games gold medalists for Turkey
Competitors at the 1991 Mediterranean Games
Mediterranean Games medalists in wrestling
European Wrestling Championships medalists
20th-century Turkish people
21st-century Turkish people